Hypsibius vaskelae is a species of tardigrade in the class Eutardigrada.  The species was described from a freshwater sample near Saint Petersburg, Russia. It has wrinkled cuticle and cuticular bars between the bases of its claws on the first four legs. The species most closely resembles Hypsibius marcelli and Hypsibius septulatus, although has a wrinkled dorsal cuticle, thinner claws, and presence of lunules on the claws of all legs.

References 

Hypsibiidae